Tomáš Dvořák (born May 7, 1995) is a Czech professional ice hockey defenceman. He is currently playing with HC Karlovy Vary of the Czech Extraliga.

Dvořák made his Czech Extraliga debut playing with HC Karlovy Vary during the 2013–14 Czech Extraliga season.

References

1995 births
Living people
Czech ice hockey defencemen
HC Karlovy Vary players
Sportspeople from Havlíčkův Brod